Joseph A. Cari Jr. is a merchant banker, public policy expert, and philanthropist currently residing in New York.Cari's professional career has spanned the worlds of merchant banking, media, public policy, politics, law and education. 

Cari was appointed by US President William Clinton as chairman of the board of the Woodrow Wilson Center for International Scholars; a US government think-thank. In that capacity, he was recognized for recruiting the Honorable Lee Hamilton as President of the Center, supporting his appointment as co-chair of the 9-11 Commission and building bi-partisan support within the US Congress. Cari also worked with UN Ambassador Richard Holbrooke on the issue of US funding of the United Nations. He is a member of the Council on Foreign Relations. Cari currently also serves on the board of directors of the Westlake New Energy Group (a European-based clean energy company with corporate headquarters in the Netherlands and Germany).
On the healthcare front, Cari founded Ciavierella Partners, a family office investing in healthcare and technology. He sits the board of directors of Biolinka, a London-based Merchant Bank, and on the advisory board of Hi55, a London and Washington, D.C.,-based fintech company.

Cari has participated in the World Economic Forum in Davos, Switzerland, and has been published on foreign policy issues on various publications, including the Financial Times, World Policy Journal, Beirut Daily News, The New York Times, Chicago Sun Times and the Chicago Tribune. He previously served as chairman of the board of directors of the World Policy Institute. He has lectured on foreign policy and US presidential politics at the US Lebanese American University in Beirut, Lebanon; Loyola Marymount University (Los Angeles) and Villanova University (Philadelphia).

Biography

Family and education
Cari, an Italian American, was raised in Chicago, Illinois. He is the son of Dr. Joseph and Elaine Cari, and has 3 siblings. Joseph Cari Sr. was a prominent physician and surgeon in Chicago who headed the Department of Family Medicine at Mercy Hospital Medical Center in Chicago, Illinois. Dr. Cari was also the author of "The Delivery of Emergency Care" [1] who served on the faculty of University of Illinois at Chicago Medical School, and as the Chief Medical Officer for the Chicago Fire Department. Mrs. Elaine Cari served as a Member of the Women's Auxiliary of the Mercy Hospital & Medical Center. She was a homemaker and mother of five children.

 
Cari graduated cum laude from the University of Notre Dame with a B.A. degree in sociology. As an undergraduate at Notre Dame, he was a member of the Varsity baseball team, and was president of Fisher Hall. In 1978 he earned a J.D. from the University of Notre Dame Law School. Cari was awarded, and completed, a fellowship at the Institute of Politics at the John F. Kennedy School of Government at Harvard University.

Personal life

Cari married Rita Bahr, a corporate lawyer who specialized in mergers and acquisitions for Motorola Corporation. Ms. Bahr passed in 2002.[2]Joseph has one daughter, Nicole, who resides in Los Angeles.

Business career
Cari's professional career has spanned the worlds of merchant banking, media, public policy, politics, law and education.

Charitable activities
Rita Bahr Scholarship Fund:

Joseph established the Rita Bahr Cari Memorial Fund at the University of Notre Dame's Law School, Center for Civil and Human Rights. This fund was created as a living memorial for his wife, who spent her childhood in Central and South America. The fund is used to advance the Center's mission to aid victims of human rights violations and "will enable the center to enhance its innovative and internationally renowned contributions in teaching, research, and service on behalf of human rights. All graduates of this program (a number of whom are from Central and South America) are an integral part of an international network of lawyers who, through their teaching and practice, strive to develop a global human rights culture.Rita Bahr Scholars for 2012:

Audrey Mena (Colombia) is an Afro-Colombian human rights lawyer who earned her law degree from the Technological University of Chocó in 2010.  Inhabited largely by the descendants of African slaves brought by Colombia's Spanish colonizers, the department of Chocó is economically, ethnically and culturally distinct from the majority population in Colombia.  Ms. Mena's research and advocacy focus on the human rights violations experienced by Afro-Colombians in Chocó, which result from crushing poverty, socio-environmental conflicts that result from illegal gold mining, and violence from guerillas and paramilitaries who seek to control this remote jungle for coca cultivation and drug smuggling routes.  In 2009, the U.S. Embassy in Bogota awarded Ms. Mena the Martin Luther King, Jr. Fellowship for Young Afro-Colombian Leaders, recognizing her exceptional potential as an advocate for racial and environmental justice in Colombia.

Sara Milena Ferrer (Colombia), also an Afro-Colombian human rights lawyer, earned her law degree from the University of Cartagena in 2008.  After graduation, Ms. Ferrer became the first graduate of her law school to receive a clerkship with the Colombian Constitutional Court, one of the most highly regarded constitutional tribunals in the world.  As a clerk for Justice Sierra Porto, her work includes writing draft decisions for cases involving economic, social and cultural rights violations.  Ms. Ferrer also works for Racial Discrimination Watch in Bogota, where she provides guidance to Afro-Colombian organizations in their effort to seek reparations for victims of extrajudicial violence from Colombia's armed conflict.

Christian Gonzalez (Guatemala) earned his LL.B. magna cum laude from the Jesuit Rafael Landivar University in 2010, where he is also completing an M.A. in Philosophy.  Mr. Gonzalez became involved in human rights work through assisting two alumni of the CCHR's human rights program in successfully representing the family of Florencio Chitay Nech before the Inter-American Court of Human Rights; the Court held Guatemala responsible for the 1981 forced disappearance of Mr. Chitay Nech, an indigenous Mayan political leader.  Currently, Mr. Gonzalez works for a law firm where he represents victims of human rights violations and government corruption before domestic tribunals.  His pro bono work includes presenting workshops on HIV transmission on behalf of the National Council for the Prevention of HIV/AIDS and promoting access to justice in rural indigenous communities.

 Rita Bahr Children's Art for Haiti, University Of Notre Dame, ACE program in Haiti: Cari sponsored the Children's Art for Haiti Program which supports meals for children of Basile Moreau School and fosters creativity by sharing the beauty of their artwork and their dreams for the future. 2008 – 2013
 Save Venice Foundation: Member, 2011–2014
 Broadway Cares: Supporter, 2011–2013

Educational affiliations 
•	Villanova University / Center for Public Policy and Research: Lecturer - "Foreign Policy and US Presidential Politics", 2011
•	Loyola Marymount University, Institute for Leadership Studies: chairman, advisory board; Lecturer - "American Presidential Politics and the Role of Women", Cari was awarded "The Service & Leadership Award" by The Institute for Leadership Studies of Loyola Marymount University, 2011 – present
•	Lebanese American University: Lecturer - "American Foreign Policy and U.S. Presidential Politics", 2010 – 20113
•	The American University Center For Global Peace (Washington D.C.): Senior Advisor, 2008–2011
•	University of Notre Dame: Guest Lecturer - "Transformations in Life", 2005
•	University of Notre Dame Law School: Member, Advisory Board 2003–2005
•	Dartmouth College Tuck School of Business: John F. Foster Center for Private Equity, Advisory Board 2003–2005
•	Harvard University School of Public Health: Leadership Council, Member 2003–2005
•	University of Notre Dame: Kroc Institute for Conflict Resolution, Chairman, Advisory Board 2001–2003
•	University of Notre Dame Law School: Guest Lecturer - "Life in Big Law Firms" 1998
•	John Marshall Law School: Visiting Professor – Uniform Commercial Code 1981
•	Leadership Greater Chicago Fellows Program - 1985-1986

Political service
•	Democratic National Committee, Member, 2000–2005.
•	Democratic National Committee, Member of Executive Committee, 2000.
•	Democratic Senatorial Campaign Committee, Vice Chairman of Finance committee, 1995.
•	Democratic National Committee, General Counsel to Rules Committee, 1980 & 1984.
•	Democratic National Committee, Member of Platform Accountability Commission, 1983.

Presidential campaigns
•	Gore for President, National Finance Chairman, 2000.[3]
•	Kerrey (D-Neb.) for President, Finance Committee Member, 1991–1992.
•	Biden for President, Mid-West Political Director, 1987.
•	Mondale for President, Associate General Counsel, 1984.
•	Carter for President, Illinois General Counsel, 1980.

Public service

Woodrow Wilson Center for International Scholars
Joseph Cari worked closely with authors & editors of books published by the Wilson Center Press, driving thought leadership in the subjects of politics, culture, society and history between the years 1995 and 2002, including the following titles:

 Bridled Ambition: Why Countries Constrain Their Nuclear Capabilities. Mitchell Reiss, Washington D.C.: Woodrow Wilson Press (Copub: Johns Hopkins University Press), 1995.
 Race: The History of an Idea in the West. Ivan Hannaford, Washington D.C.: Woodrow Wilson Press (Copub: Johns Hopkins University Press), 1996.
 Funding the Modern American State, 1941–1995. W. Eliot Brownlee, Washington D.C.: Woodrow Wilson Press (Copub: Johns Hopkins University Press), 1996.
 The Politics of Elections in Southeast Asia. R.H. Taylor, Washington D.C.: Woodrow Wilson Press (Copub: Johns Hopkins University Press), 1996.
 Preparing for the Urban Future. Michael A. Cohen, Blair A. Ruble, Joseph S. Tulchin and Allison M. Garland, Washington D.C.: Woodrow Wilson Press (Copub: Johns Hopkins University Press), 1996.
 The Crisis in Kashmir: Portents of War, Hopes of Peace. Sumit Ganguly, Washington D.C.: Woodrow Wilson Press (Copub: Johns Hopkins University Press), 1997.
 For Democracy's Sake. Kevin F. Quigley, Washington D.C.: Woodrow Wilson Press (Copub: Johns Hopkins University Press), 1997.
 Reconstructed Lives: Women and Iran's Islamic Revolution. Haleh Esfandiari, Washington D.C.: Woodrow Wilson Press (Copub: Johns Hopkins University Press), 1997.
 American Diplomacy and the End of the Cold War. Robert L. Hutchings, Washington D.C.: Woodrow Wilson Press (Copub: Johns Hopkins University Press), 1997.
 The Historical Imagination in Early Modern Britain. Donald R. Kelley and David Harris Sacks, Washington D.C.: Woodrow Wilson Press (Copub: Johns Hopkins University Press), 1997.
 Beyond the Monolith. Peter J. Stavrakis, Joan DeBardeleben and Larry Black, Washington D.C.: Woodrow Wilson Press (Copub: Johns Hopkins University Press), 1997.
 Beyond Gender. Betty Friedan, Washington D.C.: Woodrow Wilson Press (Copub: Johns Hopkins University Press), 1997.
 Churchill as Peacemaker. James W. Miller, Washington D.C.: Woodrow Wilson Press (Copub: Johns Hopkins University Press), 1997.
 Brothers in Arms: The Rise and Fall of the Sino-Soviet Alliance 1945-1963-Cold War International History Project Series. Odd Arne Westad, Washington D.C.: Woodrow Wilson Press (Copub: Johns Hopkins University Press), 1998.
 India and Pakistan: The First Fifty Years. Selig S. Harrison, Paul Kreisberg and Dennis Kux, Washington D.C.: Woodrow Wilson Press (Copub: Johns Hopkins University Press), 1998.
 At the End of the American Century. Robert L. Hutchings, Washington D.C.: Woodrow Wilson Press (Copub: Johns Hopkins University Press), 1998.
 Dilemmas of Scale in America's Federal Democracy. Martha Derthick, Washington D.C.: Woodrow Wilson Press (Copub: Johns Hopkins University Press), 1998.
 Race, Self-Employment, and Upward Mobility. Timothy Bates, Washington D.C.: Woodrow Wilson Press (Copub: Johns Hopkins University Press), 1998.
 In the Face of the Facts. Robert Whitman Fox and Robert B. Westbrook, Washington D.C.: Woodrow Wilson Press (Copub: Johns Hopkins University Press), 1998.
 The Quest for Sustained Growth: Southeast Asian and Southeast European Cases. Samuel F. Wells Jr., Barry M. Hager, Keith Crane, Paul Tibbitts and Karen Zietlow, Washington D.C.: Woodrow Wilson Press (Copub: Johns Hopkins University Press), 1999.
 Taking Stock: American Government in the Twentieth Century. Morton Keller and R. Shep Melnick, Washington D.C.: Woodrow Wilson Press (Copub: Johns Hopkins University Press), 1999.
 Reading Mixed Signals: Ambivalence in American Public Opinion about Government. Albert H. Cantril and Susan Davis Cantril, Washington D.C.: Woodrow Wilson Press (Copub: Johns Hopkins University Press), 1999.
 Strategic Balance and Confidence Building Measures in the Americas. Joseph S. Tulchin, Francisco Rojas Aravena and Ralph H. Espach, Washington D.C.: Woodrow Wilson Press (Copub: Johns Hopkins University Press), 1999.
 Paradoxes of Democracy. S. N. Eisenstadt, Washington D.C.: Woodrow Wilson Press (Copub: Johns Hopkins University Press), 1999.
 Welfare Reform: A Race to the Bottom?. Sanford F. Schram and Samuel H. Beer, Washington D.C.: Woodrow Wilson Press (Copub: Johns Hopkins University Press), 1999.
 The American Planning Tradition: Culture and Policy. Robert Fishman, Washington D.C.: Woodrow Wilson Press (Copub: Johns Hopkins University Press), 1999.
 Inventing Grand Strategy and Teaching Command: The Classic Works of Alfred Thayer Mahan Reconsidered. Jon Tetsuro Sumida, Washington D.C.: Woodrow Wilson Press (Copub: Johns Hopkins University Press), 1999.
 Comparative Peace Processes in Latin America. Cynthia J. Arnson, Washington D.C.: Woodrow Wilson Press (Copub: Johns Hopkins University Press), 1999.
 Rabin and Israel's National Security. Efraim Inbar, Washington D.C.: Woodrow Wilson Press (Copub: Johns Hopkins University Press), 1999.
 NetPolicy.com: Public Agenda for a Digital World. Leslie David Simon, Washington D.C.: Woodrow Wilson Press (Copub: Johns Hopkins University Press), 2000.
 The Future of Merit: Twenty Years after the Civil Service Reform Act. James P. Pfiffner and Douglas A. Brook, Washington D.C.: Woodrow Wilson Press (Copub: Johns Hopkins University Press), 2000.
 Rogue States and U.S. Foreign Policy: Containment after the Cold War. Robert S. Litwak, Washington D.C.: Woodrow Wilson Press (Copub: Johns Hopkins University Press), 2000.
 Combating Corruption in Latin America. Joseph S. Tulchin and Ralph H. Espach, Washington D.C.: Woodrow Wilson Press (Copub: Johns Hopkins University Press), 2000.
 Nationalism and the Crowd in Liberal Hungary, 1848–1914. Alice Freifeld, Washington D.C.: Woodrow Wilson Press (Copub: Johns Hopkins University Press), 2000.
 The United States and Pakistan, 1947–2000: Disenchanted Allies. Dennis Kux, Washington D.C.: Woodrow Wilson Press (Copub: Johns Hopkins University Press), 2001.
 Second Metropolis: Pragmatic Pluralism in Gilded Age Chicago, Silver Age Moscow, and Meiji Osaka. Blair A. Ruble, Washington D.C.: Woodrow Wilson Press (Copub: Johns Hopkins University Press), 2001.
 Asian Americans and Politics: Perspectives, Experiences, Prospects. Gordon H. Chang, Washington D.C.: Woodrow Wilson Press (Copub: Johns Hopkins University Press), 2001.
 The Breakdown of Class Politics: A Debate on Post-Industrial Stratification. Terry Nichols Clark and Seymour Martin Lipset, Washington D.C.: Woodrow Wilson Press (Copub: Johns Hopkins University Press), 2001.
 Economic Cold War: America's Embargo against China and the Sino-Soviet Alliance, 1949-1963-Cold War International History Project Series. Shu Guang Zhang, Washington D.C.: Woodrow Wilson Press (Copub: Johns Hopkins University Press), 2001.
 Between the State and Islam. Charles E. Butterworth and I. William Zartman, Washington D.C.: Woodrow Wilson Press (Copub: Johns Hopkins University Press), 2001.
 Kinship and Capitalism: Marriage, Family, and Business in the English-speaking World, 1580–1740. Richard Grassby, Washington D.C.: Woodrow Wilson Press (Copub: Johns Hopkins University Press), 2001.
 Regional Russia in Transition: Studies from Yaroslavl. Jeffrey W. Hahn, Washington D.C.: Woodrow Wilson Press (Copub: Johns Hopkins University Press), 2001.
 Congress and the People. Donald R. Wolfensberger, Washington D.C.: Woodrow Wilson Press (Copub: Johns Hopkins University Press), 2001.
 Commerce in Russian Urban Culture 1861–1914. William Craft Brumfield, Boris V. Anan'ich and Yuri A. Petrov, Washington D.C.: Woodrow Wilson Press (Copub: Johns Hopkins University Press), 2001.
 European Defense Cooperation: Asset or Threat to NATO?. Michael Quinlan, Washington D.C.: Woodrow Wilson Press (Copub: Johns Hopkins University Press), 2001.
 A Revolutionary Year: The Middle East in 1958. Wm. Roger Louis and Owen Roger, Washington D.C.: Woodrow Wilson Press (Copub: Johns Hopkins University Press), 2002.
 Political Parties after Communism: Developments in East-Central Europe. Tomáš Kostelecký, Washington D.C.: Woodrow Wilson Press (Copub: Johns Hopkins University Press), 2002.
 Replicating Microfinance in the United States. James H. Carr and Zhong Yi Tong, Washington D.C.: Woodrow Wilson Press (Copub: Johns Hopkins University Press), 2002.
 Entangled Evolutions: Media and Democratization in Eastern Europe. Peter Gross, Washington D.C.: Woodrow Wilson Press (Copub: Johns Hopkins University Press), 2002.
 The Idea of Europe: From Antiquity to the European Union. Anthony Pagden, Washington D.C.: Woodrow Wilson Press (Copub: Johns Hopkins University Press), 2002.
 Fragmented Space in the Russian Federation. Blair A. Ruble, Jodi Koehn and Nancy Popson, Washington D.C.: Woodrow Wilson Press (Copub: Johns Hopkins University Press), 2002.
 The Communitarian Persuasion. Philip Selznick, Washington D.C.: Woodrow Wilson Press (Copub: Johns Hopkins University Press), 2002.
 Conflict Unending: India-Pakistan Tensions since 1947. Sumit Ganguly, Washington D.C.: Woodrow Wilson Press (Copub: Johns Hopkins University Press), 2002.
 Beyond State Crisis? Post-Colonial Africa and Post-Soviet Eurasia in Comparative Perspective. Mark R. Beissinger and Crawford Young, Washington D.C.: Woodrow Wilson Press (Copub: Johns Hopkins University Press), 2002.
 Rural Reform in Post-Soviet Russia. David J. O'Brien and Stephen K. Wegren, Washington D.C.: Woodrow Wilson Press (Copub: Johns Hopkins University Press), 2002.
 Uncle Sam and Us: Globalization, Neoconservatism, and the Canadian State. Stephen Clarkson, Washington D.C.: Woodrow Wilson Press (Copub: Johns Hopkins University Press), 2002.
 A Creative Tension: The Foreign Policy Roles of the President and the Congress. Lee H. Hamilton and Jordan Tama, Washington D.C.: Woodrow Wilson Press (Copub: Johns Hopkins University Press), 2002.
 Environmental Peacemaking. Ken Conca and Geoffrey D. Dabelko, Washington D.C.: Woodrow Wilson Press (Copub: Johns Hopkins University Press), 2002.
 Democracy and the Internet: Allies or Adversaries?. Javier Coralles, Donald R. Wolfensberger and Leslie David Simon, Washington D.C.: Woodrow Wilson Press (Copub: Johns Hopkins University Press), 2002.

Federal plea agreement 
In 2005, after full cooperation with the US Attorney's office in Chicago, Cari entered into a plea agreement for violation of 18 U.S.C § 1951. The Court, with the agreement of the government, commuted Cari's case on April 24, 2013.

References

External links
 Politics & Economics Blog – JosephCari.com.
 Washington supports an ideology based on ethnic purity.
 Official Website – JoeCari.com.
 
 Joseph Cari on the Obama Administration transition to power and implications for Middle East region at DailyStar.com on 03/05/09.
 Mr. Joseph Cari on Palestinian Economic Development at FT.com on 12/17/08.
 Mr. Joseph Cari on Israel, America, & a One-State Solution at FT.com on 12/10/09.

American lawyers
Philanthropists from Illinois
American chief executives of financial services companies
Notre Dame College of Arts and Letters alumni
Notre Dame Law School alumni
Harvard Kennedy School people
Notre Dame Fighting Irish baseball players
1952 births
Living people
Businesspeople from Chicago
Private equity and venture capital investors
American chairpersons of corporations